This is a list of Mexican television related events from 2015.

Events
11 March - The Federal Telecommunications Institute awards national television network concessions to Grupo Imagen and Grupo Radio Centro.
10 April - Grupo Radio Centro announces it will only pay the security deposit on its network concession instead of the full payment, leaving Imagen alone in building a national television network.
17 December - Eduardo "Chile" Miranda wins the fourth season of Big Brother México.
20 December - 24-year-old violinist Fernando Badillo wins the second season of México Tiene Talento.

Debuts
21 September - Big Brother México (2002-2005, 2015–present)

Television shows

1970s
Plaza Sésamo (1972–present)

2010s
La Voz... México (2011–present)
México Tiene Talento (2014–present)

Ending this year

Births

Deaths

See also
List of Mexican films of 2015
2015 in Mexico